"Kung Fu Fighting" is a disco song by Jamaican vocalist Carl Douglas, written by Douglas and produced by British-Indian musician Biddu. It was released in 1974 as the first single from his debut album, Kung Fu Fighting and Other Great Love Songs (1974), on the cusp of a chopsocky film craze and rose to the top of the British, Australian, Canadian, and American charts, in addition to reaching the top of the Soul Singles chart. It received a Gold certification from the RIAA in 1974 and popularized disco music. It eventually went on to sell eleven million records worldwide, making it one of the best-selling singles of all time. The song uses the quintessential Oriental riff, a short musical phrase that is used to signify Chinese culture.

"Kung Fu Fighting" was rated number 100 in VH1's 100 Greatest one-hit wonders, and number one in the UK Channel 4's Top 10 One Hit Wonders list in 2000, the same channel's 50 Greatest One Hit Wonders poll in 2006 and Bring Back ... the one-hit Wonders, for which Carl Douglas performed the song in a live concert. The song was covered by CeeLo Green with Jack Black and The Vamps for the first and third films of the Kung Fu Panda franchise respectively. In 2009 a rerecorded version recorded by Carl Douglas was released as a playable song for the game Lego Rock Band.

Background and composition
The song was originally meant to be a B-side to "I Want to Give You My Everything" (written by Brooklyn songwriter Larry Weiss and sung by Carl Douglas). The producer Biddu originally hired Douglas to sing "I Want to Give You My Everything" but needed something to record for the B-side, and asked Douglas if he had any lyrics they could use. Douglas showed several, out of which Biddu chose the one that would later be called "Kung Fu Fighting" and worked out a melody for it without taking it too seriously.

After having spent over two hours recording the A-side and then taking a break, "Kung Fu Fighting" was recorded quickly in the last ten minutes of studio time, in only two takes, due to a three-hour time constraint for the entire session. According to Biddu, Kung Fu Fighting' was the B-side so I went over the top on the 'huhs' and the 'hahs' and the chopping sounds. It was a B-side: who was going to listen?" After hearing both songs, Robin Blanchflower of Pye Records insisted that "Kung Fu Fighting" be the A-side instead.

Following its release, the song did not receive any radio airplay for the first five weeks and sold poorly, but the song began gaining popularity in dance clubs, eventually entering the UK Singles Chart at number 42 on 17 August 1974 and reaching the top on 21 September, where it remained for three weeks. It was then released in the United States, where it quickly topped the Billboard Hot 100 chart. The single went on to sell eleven million records worldwide. At the Amusement & Music Operators Association (AMOA) Jukebox Awards in 1975, the song was awarded "Jukebox Soul Record of the Year" for being the year's highest-earning soul music song played on jukebox machines in the United States. The song was featured in the 1981 film, This Is Elvis.

Charts

Weekly charts

Year-end charts

All-time charts

Sales and certifications

Track listing
"Kung Fu Fighting" – 3:15
"Gamblin' Man" – 3:03

Bus Stop version

British dance act Bus Stop reached number eight on the UK Singles Chart with their 1998 remix single of "Kung Fu Fighting", which sampled the original vocals by Carl Douglas and added rap verses. In Australia, the single received a gold certification from ARIA.

Charts

Weekly charts

Year-end charts

Sales and certifications

See also
List of 1970s one-hit wonders in the United States
List of Top 25 singles for 1974 in Australia
List of Dutch Top 40 number-one singles of 1974
List of number-one singles of 1974 (Canada)
List of number-one singles of 1974 (France)
List of number-one hits of 1974 (Germany)
List of number-one singles of 1974 (Ireland)
List of number-one singles in 1974 (New Zealand)
List of UK Singles Chart number ones of the 1970s
List of Billboard Hot 100 number-one singles of 1974
List of Cash Box Top 100 number-one singles of 1974
List of number-one R&B singles of 1975 (U.S.)
List of number-one singles from the 1990s (New Zealand)

References

1974 songs
1974 debut singles
1998 debut singles
Disco songs
Novelty songs
Pye Records singles
20th Century Fox Records singles
All Around the World Productions singles
Billboard Hot 100 number-one singles
Cashbox number-one singles
Dutch Top 40 number-one singles
Number-one singles in Australia
Number-one singles in Austria
Number-one singles in France
Number-one singles in Germany
Number-one singles in New Zealand
Number-one singles in South Africa
Irish Singles Chart number-one singles
RPM Top Singles number-one singles
UK Singles Chart number-one singles
Ultratop 50 Singles (Flanders) number-one singles
Songs written by Biddu